The Kunming catfish (Silurus mento) is a critically endangered species of catfish in the family Siluridae. It is endemic to Dian Chi Lake, China. There have been no confirmed records in decades and it is feared extinct. S. mento grows to a length of  TL.

References

Silurus
Endemic fauna of Yunnan
Freshwater fish of China
Fish described in 1904
Taxonomy articles created by Polbot
Critically endangered fish